The Preacher and the Cross is a 1990 role-playing game adventure for Call of Cthulhu published by ADP Systems.

Plot summary
The Preacher and the Cross is an adventure in which a wealthy woman has been experiencing recurring dreams foretelling the murder of a priest.

Reception
Mike Jarvis reviewed The Preacher and the Cross for Games International magazine, and gave it a rating of 5 out of 10, and stated that "this is a reasonable adventure for more cerebral players, but by no means an essential purchase."

References

Call of Cthulhu (role-playing game) adventures
Role-playing game supplements introduced in 1990